Zarnitsa is a rural locality (a passing loop) in Bezrukavsky Selsoviet, Rubtsovsky District, Altai Krai, Russia. The population was 274 as of 2013. There are 5 streets.

Geography 
Zarnitsa is located 19 km north of Rubtsovsk (the district's administrative centre) by road. Zakharovo is the nearest rural locality.

References 

Rural localities in Rubtsovsky District